Lt. Gen. Christon Tembo (1944 – 6 March 2009)  was a Zambian politician and army commander. He was Minister of Foreign Affairs from 1995 to 1996 and the sixth vice-president of Zambia from 1997 to 2001. He ran for president in the December 2001 election and took third place, with about 13% of the vote.

In 1989, he and others were charged with plotting to overthrow President Kenneth Kaunda, which was judged as an act of treason worthy of the death penalty. He was defended in court successfully by attorney Levy Mwanawasa, who was elected as President in 2002.

He retired from military service in 1990 and joined the Movement for Multiparty Democracy as vice-president of the party under Frederick Chiluba, who became President in 1991. He fell out with Chiluba over the latter's attempt to gain a third term in office in 2001 and then formed the Forum for Democracy and Development (FDD) as a breakaway party, which he led until his death.

He died on March 6, 2009, in Lusaka.

References

Vice-presidents of Zambia
1944 births
2009 deaths
Foreign Ministers of Zambia
Zambian military personnel
Movement for Multi-Party Democracy politicians
Forum for Democracy and Development politicians
Members of the National Assembly of Zambia